Jamshid Ali Dizaei (transliteration: Jamshīd ʿAlī Dizaī) (born 1962) is a former Commander in London's Metropolitan Police Service, Iranian-born with dual nationality, and formerly one of Britain's more senior Muslim police officers. Dizaei came to prominence as a result of his outspoken views on racial discrimination in the London Metropolitan Police and various allegations of malpractice on his part. He had received advancement after his criticism of the force following his claims of racism. He was a frequent media commentator on a variety of issues, mainly concerned with ethnicity and religion. In April 2008, he was promoted to Commander, responsible for West London.

In August 2008, he was presented with the Long Service and Good Conduct Medal by the Commissioner, Sir Ian Blair.

Dizaei became the President of the National Black Police Association in 2008.

On 8 February 2010, he was convicted in the Crown Court before Mr Justice Simon on charges of perverting the course of justice and of misconduct in a public office, and was jailed for four years. He had been suspended on full pay since September 2008, and on 31 March 2010 was formally dismissed from the Metropolitan Police.

On 16 May 2011, Dizaei's appeal against this conviction was successful and the conviction was quashed, but after a retrial in 2012, he was again found guilty of perverting the course of justice and of misconduct in a public office. He was sentenced to three years' imprisonment. On 15 May 2012, he was dismissed from the Metropolitan Police. Dizaei appealed again, but on 14 February 2013 his appeal was dismissed. The Lord Chief Justice said that 'the guilty verdict was fully justified' and that the conviction 'was and remains safe'.

In 2014, Dizaei formed Covert Security Limited which is an international investigations consultancy specialising in the tracing and locating of assets, individuals and carrying out cold-case reviews.

Early life and career to 2000
Dizaei was born in Tehran, Iran where his father was a deputy commissioner of police. He moved to the UK in 1973. He was educated at Slindon College, a private boarding school in Arundel, West Sussex. Dizaei studied law at university, gaining a BA (Hons) and LLM in Law from City University London and a diploma in policing from Cambridge University, later gaining a PhD from Brunel University, and joined Thames Valley Police in 1986. He served in Henley-on-Thames, in uniform and in the Criminal Investigation Department, rising to the rank of Chief Inspector. He was appointed an adviser on race issues to the Home Secretary, and then transferred to the Metropolitan Police Service (MPS) on promotion to Superintendent on 29 March 1999 as a staff officer to Assistant Commissioner Ian Johnston.

On 17 May 1999, he was transferred to Kensington police station and on 3 April 2000, became Superintendent Operations there. He was already outspoken on race issues, first coming to media attention in November 1999 for his criticism of questions asked in promotion exams.

Controversies

Operation HELIOS
From 2000, Dizaei was investigated by the force after allegations of taking bribes, using drugs and prostitutes, and spying for Iran.

Racial discrimination claims
Dizaei brought his own claim for racial discrimination in the conduct of the investigations by the MPS. This was withdrawn after the MPS paid him £80,000 and reinstated him in October 2003.

In 2004, the Independent Police Complaints Commission (IPCC) described Operation Helios as having been "seriously flawed", and it was later described as a "total waste of taxpayers' money." Dizaei eventually faced a minor disciplinary action, having been cleared of all criminal charges. The MPS issued a public statement saying that Dizaei returned to work with his "integrity demonstrably intact".

Dizaei was promoted to Chief Superintendent in May 2004 and became Borough Commander of Hounslow and later Borough Commander of Hammersmith and Fulham. In 2006, he was in the headlines again for criticising the Forest Gate raid and passenger profiling on aircraft. The Police Federation has accused him of "blissful ignorance" for the latter.

In December 2006, it was made public that during Operation Helios the MPS had unlawfully tapped over 3,500 private calls made by Dizaei. The ruling was made by the Investigatory Powers Tribunal after referral by the NBPA.

In 2008, Dizaei commenced Employment Tribunal proceedings against Catherine Crawford (the Chief Executive of the Metropolitan Police Authority), Sir Paul Stephenson and others, claiming that they had specifically targeted him for being an outspoken critic of their record on race and for Dizaei supporting Assistant Commissioner Tarique Ghaffur in his race discrimination claim against Paul Stephenson and Ian Blair.

Not One of Us
In March 2007, Dizaei published Not One of Us, an account of his police career to date, and of the Operation Helios investigation. Prior to publication, the MPS issued a statement noting that it "considers it a matter of regret that Chief Superintendent Dizaei has felt it necessary to write this book", and reiterating its support for the Helios team. Upon release the book was serialised on BBC Radio 4 and in The Times.

In November 2007, Stephen Otter, then the Chief Constable of Devon and Cornwall, successfully sued Dizaei and the publishers of his book ″Not One of Us″ for libel. The libel action centred on claims by Dizaei in his book that Mr Otter had given false evidence as a prosecution witness during the course of proceedings against Mr Dizaei at an Old Bailey trial for perverting the course of justice - which resulted in his acquittal. At a hearing in the High Court of Justice, Dizaei, his co-author and the publisher of the book admitted that "there was no basis to suggest that Mr Otter was not telling the truth" at the trial, and formally apologised to Otter in court. In addition to the apology, Dizaei, his co-author and publisher agreed to make a substantial donation to a charity of Otter's choice and to pay his legal costs.

In June 2007, Ian Blair apologised for Operation Helios, after the MPS and the NBPA agreed to resolve disputes arising out of Helios.

In March 2008, and at the third attempt, Dizaei was promoted to the rank of Commander.

On 12 September 2008, the MPS announced that Dizaei was the subject of a complaint alleging that he had improperly provided advice to solicitors defending a woman accused over a fatal hit-and-run accident.

Dizaei claimed that this was a malicious complaint brought about by Lord MacKenzie to further his business interests. MacKenzie was rebuked by the Black Rod for using the House of Lords letterhead to make his complaint against Dizaei.

Yas Restaurant and criminal convictions
Dizaei was suspended again on 18 September 2008, after being investigated for various allegations including an arrest he made on 18 July 2008 outside his uncle's west London restaurant. A 24-year-old web designer, Waad al-Baghdadi, claimed that Dizaei had not paid £600 for a website he had commissioned and when Baghdadi confronted him about this, a public quarrel ensued. Dizaei arrested Baghdadi, who later made a complaint which was investigated by the IPCC.

On 21 May 2009, the Crown Prosecution Service announced that Dizaei faced two criminal charges. He was again charged with perverting the course of justice and misconduct in a public office. The charges related to the incident (above) in which Dizaei had arrested Waad al-Baghdadi. A decision not to charge that individual was made by the CPS in August 2008. In a statement, the NBPA said: "It is outrageous that the CPS, for the second time in four years, has commenced prosecution against the president of the National Black Police Association, Commander Ali Dizaei. This has not happened to any other senior police officer in the history of the MPS or the CPS."

The matter duly came to trial in the Crown Court at Southwark in January 2010 before the Hon Mr Justice Simon, with Dizaei facing counts of misconduct in a public office and perverting the course of justice.

On 8 February 2010, Dizaei was found guilty on both counts, and jailed for four years. On 22 June 2010, he was duly refused leave to appeal to the Court of Appeal, Criminal Division. He had sought to appeal against both conviction and sentence. The grounds of the proposed appeal were that al-Baghdadi had used a false name and nationality.

On 16 May 2011, the Court of Appeal granted leave to appeal and allowed the appeal, quashing the convictions. Lord Justice Hughes, Vice-President of the Court of Appeal said that the court "simply [did] not know whether this conviction is soundly based or not".  He continued, "In those circumstances we are driven to the conclusion that it cannot be regarded as safe." This was despite the fact that Waad Al Baghdadi was at this stage only suspected of being a benefit fraudster. A re-trial was ordered. Dizaei was released with immediate effect.

Dizaei subsequently said that he wished to clear his name and expressed his desire to rejoin Scotland Yard as a Commander.

On 27 June 2011, the key witness in the quashed conviction of Dizaei, Waad Al-Baghdadi, was charged with benefit fraud (in excess of £27,000), which included false disability claims in the name of his deceased father.

On 3 July 2011, the Sunday Times reported an allegation that police pressured a young Muslim woman to withdraw her allegation of rape against Waad Al-Baghdadi. On 13 February 2012, Al-Baghdadi was arrested and bailed in relation to an alleged serious assault in September 2009 and an investigation was reopened into allegations that he raped a young Muslim woman in April and September 2010.

Temporary reinstatement
On Friday 1 October 2011, Dizaei was reinstated after a Police Appeals Tribunal meeting gave a unanimous decision in favour of his reinstatement to the rank of Commander in the Metropolitan Police. It was decided by the MPA that Dizaei would still be suspended on full pay. Dizaei said that he would appeal that decision. He remained suspended until re-conviction in February 2012.

Defamation proceedings
In September 2009, Dizaei won a High Court action against the Daily Mail and the Evening Standard over a defamatory article published in June 2008. The newspapers were forced to issue an apology and pay substantial costs and damages. On receipt of the apology he issued further proceedings against the Daily Mail for an allegedly defamatory article published in September 2008 suggesting that Dizaei advised a lawyer over a criminal case.

Allegations of credit card misuse
In September 2008, he was accused by the Metropolitan Police Authority of using his corporate credit card inappropriately and his conduct was investigated by the Chief Constable of Dorset and the IPCC. Dizaei maintained that the allegations were without foundation. On 20 November 2009, after a 14-month investigation the IPCC found no evidence of dishonesty or impropriety. The IPCC managed investigation revealed that Dizaei was in fact owed £1,850, which was repaid to him by the Metropolitan Police Authority.

News of the World payment and apology
On 27 December 2009, Dizaei accepted a substantial payment and an apology from the News of the World for allegations arising from an investigation by Mazher Mahmood. The paper backed down and apologised in the face of legal action from Dizaei, after Mahmood claimed the officer "employed an illegal immigrant as his right-hand man and took him to the heart of the British establishment." The paper paid Ace Bakhtyari, who was subsequently jailed for having a fake passport and deported from the UK.

Phone hacking

Between 2000 - 2001, Andy Hayman (former Assistant Commissioner of the Metropolitan Police) permitted Dizaei's telephone calls to be intercepted and transcribed as part of Operation Helios. In 2006, the Investigatory Powers Tribunal ruled that 3,500 calls were 'unlawfully' intercepted. The Commissioner Ian Blair apologised. On 20 May 2011, Dizaei was informed that he may possibly have been subject to phone hacking by the News of the World.

Dizaei was the only police officer in the United Kingdom to have his phone hacked by the News of the World. At the time his phone was hacked, Dizaei was a serving Commander of the MPS.

During the Leveson Inquiry, Dick Fedorcio, the then director of public affairs at Scotland Yard, admitted to allowing News of the World journalist Lucy Panton to use his office and computer in Scotland Yard to write a critical story about Dizaei. The inquiry heard that Panton also used Fedorcio's email address to forward the story to the office. In the email she said she could not delete the email and pointed out it "would not be helpful for people to know" she was using Fedorcio's computer.

Retrial and reconviction

The retrial of Dizaei on charges of corruption and perverting the course of justice began in the Crown Court at Southwark on 12 January 2012 before Mr Justice Saunders. The prosecution claimed that his actions amounted to a wholesale abuse of power for his own personal and oblique reasons.

One prosecution witness, Waad Al Baghdadi, told the jury that he had recently been released from prison for claiming over £27,000 in the name of his dead father. He also admitted lying about his identity at the previous trial.

On 25 January 2012, the prosecution adduced medical evidence suggesting that Dizaei had faked physical injuries to make it look as though he had been assaulted.

On 31 January 2012, Dizaei gave evidence, relating his version of the events before, during and after the incident of 18 July 2008. He said that Mr Baghdadi's 'torrent of abuse' had frightened Mr Dizaei's wife and other bystanders. Dizaei said that he had warned Mr Baghdadi and asked him to leave, but arrested him as a result of his continued abuse and threatening behaviour. In addition to this, Dizaei claimed that Baghdadi pushed him and poked him twice with the mouthpiece of a shisha pipe. Dizaei also said that Baghdadi is a 'dishonest liar'.

The trial continued and the jury retired to consider its verdict on 9 February 2012.

On 13 February 2012, Dizaei was again convicted of misconduct in public office and attempting to pervert the course of justice. The jury's verdict was unanimous. He was sentenced to three years' imprisonment on each count. Since time he had already served in prison as a result of his earlier conviction is to be taken into account against his sentence, he was expected to be released on licence after about three months. However, he was in fact released on licence, wearing an electronic tag, in early March 2012.

On 4 July 2012, Dizaei was granted leave to appeal for the second time. On 14 February 2013, this appeal was dismissed. The Lord Chief Justice said that 'the guilty verdict was fully justified' and that the conviction 'was and remains safe'.

On 5 April 2016, Waad Al Baghdadi, admitted (whilst being interviewed by the BBC over his deportation) that "I knew that if I testified against Ali Dezai these things might come to light but I chose to do the right thing". Going on, he said: "They [Metropolitan Police Service] used me. They held a gun against Ali Dizaei and I was the bullet" after he was told that he was going to be deported by the Home Office. He said British authorities knew he had lied about his past and that he was a benefits cheat – but were still happy to use him as the key witness to convict Dizaei. Al Baghadi has now been given leave to apply for asylum in Britain.

Articles about policing
During his time in the police, Dizaei wrote articles for police journals and national newspapers, covering various policing topics.

Personal life
He was married in August 1986 in Reading, Berkshire to Natalie Downing. He has three sons by her; Kamran, Kayvon, and Kourosh. Dizaei and Downing were married for 19 years, divorcing in 2005. His current wife is Shahameh, known as Shy, whom he married in August 2007 in Ealing. They have one son Erfan.

References

Further reading
Not One of Us: The Trial that Changed Policing in Britain Forever, by Ali Dizaei & Tim Phillips, March 2007

1962 births
Living people
21st-century British criminals
21st-century Iranian criminals
Alumni of Brunel University London
British Muslims
British people convicted of perverting the course of justice
British police officers convicted of crimes
British prisoners and detainees
Date of birth missing (living people)
Iranian emigrants to the United Kingdom
Iranian prisoners and detainees
Metropolitan Police chief officers
Naturalised citizens of the United Kingdom
People from Tehran
Police officers convicted of corruption
Prisoners and detainees of England and Wales